"Thinking About You" is a song by American indie rock band Ivy. It was released as the lead single from their fifth studio album, In the Clear, in the United States on January 1, 2005.

Music video 
A highly popular animated music video was produced for the song in early 2005. The clip follows several insects interacting in a rainforest.

In media 
"Thinking About You" was included on two different soundtracks: Fever Pitch: Music from the Motion Picture and Monster-in-Law (Music from the Motion Picture).

Track listing

Release history

References 

Ivy (band) songs
2005 singles
2004 songs
Songs written by Adam Schlesinger
Nettwerk Records singles
Songs written by Dominique Durand
Songs written by Andy Chase